Vladimir Nikolov (born October 3, 1977) is a retired Bulgarian volleyball player, a former member and captain of his country's national team. He played as a wing-spiker and has been part of the Bulgarian national team in all recent championships. At a club level, he has played for Levski Siconco (five Bulgarian titles),  Erdemirspor Izmir (Turkey), Tours VB (CEV Champions League 2005–06, one championship and two Cup titles of France), Toray Arrows, Japan and Trentino Volley (One Italian championship title). With Bre Banca Lannutti Cuneo he won the bronze medal at the 2008–09 CEV Cup and also was individually awarded "Best Blocker".

With the professional club Tours Volley-Ball, he won the 2004–05 CEV Champions League and was awarded "Most Valuable Player".

Clubs
  Levski Volley (1995-2002)
  Erdemirspor (2002-2003)
  Tours Volley-Ball (2003–2006)
  Toray Arrows (2006–2007)
  Trentino Volley (2007–2008)
  Piemonte Volley (2008–2011)
  Copra Volley (2011-2012)
  Galatasaray (2012–2013)
  ASUL Lyon (2013-2016)
  Levski Volley (2018-2019)

Awards

Individual
 2004–05 CEV Champions League "Most Valuable Player"
 2008-09 CEV Cup "Best Blocker"

Clubs
 2004–05 CEV Indesit Champions League -   Champion, with Tours VB

References

External links
info about Nikolov on the FIVB site

Living people
Bulgarian men's volleyball players
Volleyball players at the 2008 Summer Olympics
Volleyball players at the 2012 Summer Olympics
Olympic volleyball players of Bulgaria
1977 births
Galatasaray S.K. (men's volleyball) players
Bulgarian expatriates in Italy
Bulgarian expatriate sportspeople in Turkey
Bulgarian expatriate sportspeople in Japan
Sportspeople from Sofia
Tours Volley-Ball players